Hard to Be a God is a West German-Soviet-French-Swiss science fiction film directed by Peter Fleischmann released in 1989, based on the 1964 novel of the same name by Arkady and Boris Strugatsky.

Grant Stevens performed the title song, while the rest of the musical score was written and played by Hans-Jürgen Fritz, ex-keyboardist for the German progressive rock band Triumvirat.

Plot

In their third millennium, the people of Earth have found a peaceful life, both large and small. This is possible because they control their emotions extremely and, above all, rely on reason.

On a distant planet, however, they find a medieval civilization of humans that they now use to test whether people really no longer have any barbaric instincts, they are poor and ignorant people. For this purpose, the scout Anton is released to live in the middle of the people, in whose eye a camera is implanted, which transmits everything he sees to a spaceship orbiting the planet and have a secret base to command the mission in a cave in the middle of the desert.

Living in the city of Arkanar under the identity of the nobleman Don Rumata, buy a house in the city who have some facilities inside before to serve to another scout, Anton seems like a fancy rich man moving on the streets of the city, but finds it increasingly difficult to endure the misery of the populace oppressed by the king and the ruthless advisor Don Reba. He tries by to speed up their progress and initiate a kind of enlightenment, although he is strictly forbidden from interfering with the world he encounters.

Rumata tries to convince his colleagues that a more active intervention must take place. However, Don Condor, an elder and more experienced observer feel that he has become too involved in native affairs and cannot see the historical perspective objectively. They remind him of the dangers of overly active meddling with the history of the planet. Not convinced, but left with no other choice, Rumata agrees to continue his work with this primitive people.

Rumata tries pumping multiple people for information, Rumata feel love interest, a young girl commoner who can't stand the brutality and horrors of fascist government of Arkanar any longer, asks to stay in Rumata's house in the city. Rumata gladly agrees and promises to eventually take her with him to a wonderful place far far away.

Don Reba reveals that he has been watching Don Rumata for some time, he recognizes Rumata as an impostor, know that he real Rumata having died a long time ago. However, Don Reba realizes that there is some supernatural power behind Rumata and he is very smart. Rumata's gold is of impossibly high quality and Rumata's sword-fighting style is unheard of, yet he has never killed a single person while staying in Arkanar despite fighting in numerous duels in the city.

Rumata uses his new status and influence in the city to rescue the real Dr. Budah as well as his own new friend Baron Pampa from prison, but around him, Arkanar succumbs to the Holy Order to keep the people under control. As the last of his friends and allies die and suffer in the turmoil of the civil war, Rumata acts with all haste to expedite the departure of Budah. Rumata asks him a theological question: what would you ask a god, if he could come from sky and fulfill any of your wishes? After a long discussion with Budah wishing and Rumata explaining the dire consequences of each of the wishes, Budah finally states that the only true gift a god could give the people is to leave them to their affairs. To this, Rumata replies that he can't bear the sight of their suffering, then he knows that Rumata referred to himself in that last sentence, rather than some hypothetical god, and looks at him with horror and hope also.

Rumata give support to the people, plans a revolution and is almost worshiped as a god for his abilities; however, he falls in love for a native woman and have new friends who must fight to defend. In the bloody clashes of a civil war that follow in the city, the king and Don Reba die. While Arkanar sinks into anarchy and terror, Anton aka Don Rumata try to help the poor, ignorant and primitive people and his new friends, but is picked up from the spaceship who landing in the night in the middle of the town because the test is over: it was Anton whose reactions were to be tested by their civilization for the chief of the experiment of humans, Mr. Mita.

The space station went on alert when the civil war began , however, they have not had a chance to react by the landing operation and try to stop that so many people can die, for what consider is the same interference with this world who provoked the civil war, they arrives to the city at night in the civil war, having had doused the entire city with a sleep inducing gas, they had discovered that Anton-Rumata have already had fought his way through the city towards the palace in the civil war, covered in blood, where he had finally presumably killed many people, was paralyzed and rescue him to carry into the space station to end the experiment of Mr. Mita.

Cast
 Edward Zentara as Rumata/Anton
 Alexander Philippenko as Reba
 Hugues Quester as Suren
 Christine Kaufmann as Okana
 Andrei Boltnev as Budach
 Gayle Hunnicutt as Doreen
 Pierre Clémenti as King
 Mikhail Gluzsky as Gauk
 Elguja Burduli as Pampa
 Regimantas Adomaitis as Don Condor (Alexander Weiland)
 Werner Herzog as Mita

References
Hard to Be a God

External links

Films based on works by Arkady and Boris Strugatsky
1989 films
1980s science fiction action films
German science fiction action films
West German films
Soviet science fiction films
Films directed by Peter Fleischmann
French science fiction action films
Swiss science fiction films
Films with screenplays by Jean-Claude Carrière
Films based on science fiction novels
Films based on Russian novels
1980s German-language films
1980s French films
1980s German films